Burgynbash (Borğonbaş) is a rural locality (a village) in Kurdymsky Selsoviet, Tatyshlinsky District, Bashkortostan, Russia. The population was 137 as of 2010. There are 3 streets.

Geography 
Burgynbash is located 30 km west of Verkhniye Tatyshly (the district's administrative centre) by road. 2-y Zirimzibash is the nearest rural locality.

References 

Rural localities in Tatyshlinsky District